is a Japanese motorcycle racer. He currently competes in the Asia Road Race AP250 Championship aboard a Honda CBR250RR. He has raced in the GP125 and J-GP3 classes of the All Japan Road Race Championship and in 2015 he was the Asia Road Racing Production 250 champion. He has also appeared in the 125cc World Championship as a wild card entry.

Career statistics

Grand Prix motorcycle racing

By season

Races by year

References

Japanese motorcycle racers
Living people
125cc World Championship riders
1993 births